Michael S. Weiner (December 21, 1961 – November 21, 2013) was an American attorney who served as the executive director of the Major League Baseball Players Association for four years. He assumed the role on June 22, 2009, replacing Donald Fehr, becoming only the fifth executive director of the union. Weiner joined the organization in September 1988 and had been general counsel since 2004.

Biography
He was born in Paterson, New Jersey. He moved to Pompton Lakes, New Jersey at the age of two and attended Pompton Lakes High School.

With Weiner at the helm, the union signed an agreement in November 2011 for a five-year contract running until December 2016, which ensured 21 consecutive years of labor peace in Major League Baseball. The agreement allowed for blood testing for human growth hormone, introduced restraints on bonuses for amateur draft picks and international signings, and restored salary arbitration eligibility for part of a class of players that lost it in the 1980s.

Weiner received his undergraduate degree in political economy from Williams College in 1983. He graduated from Harvard Law School in 1986. From 1986 to 1988, Michael served as law clerk to H. Lee Sarokin, then United States District Court Judge, in Newark, New Jersey.

A resident of Mansfield Township, Warren County, New Jersey, Weiner was an active congregant of the Jewish Center of Northwest Jersey in Warren County

Weiner was diagnosed with a brain tumor in August 2012, and died 15 months later, on November 21, 2013. He was 51 years old. He was succeeded by his deputy, Tony Clark, the first former Major League Baseball player to lead the union.

References

External links
MLBPA Bio

Major League Baseball Players Association executive directors
Major League Baseball labor relations
Harvard Law School alumni
Sportspeople from Paterson, New Jersey
People from Pompton Lakes, New Jersey
Pompton Lakes High School alumni
Williams College alumni
1961 births
2013 deaths
New Jersey lawyers
Deaths from brain cancer in the United States
Jewish American baseball people
Sportspeople from Passaic County, New Jersey
Sportspeople from Warren County, New Jersey
20th-century American lawyers
21st-century American Jews